How Did I Get Here? is a 1999 compilation album by Badly Drawn Boy. The album was created for American and Japanese audiences who were yet to be exposed to the artist. The album contains many tracks from his fourth and fifth Eps and the entire CD version of his third EP, EP 3.

The album features the one of only two CD versions of Badly Drawn Boy's fourth single "Whirlpool", an instrumental featuring production by Andy Votel which was only released on vinyl with a limited pressing; the other being on a Twisted Nerve compilation album.

Track listing 
"My Friend Cubilas"
"I need a Sign"
"Interlude"
"Meet on the Horizon"
"Road Movie"
"Kerplunk by Candlelight"
"It Came from the Ground"
"Outside there Is a Light, No. 1"
"Soul Attitude"
"Whirlpool"
"It Came from the Ground" (Andy Votel Remix)

References 

1999 compilation albums
Badly Drawn Boy albums